Parkham is a locality and small rural community in the local government areas of Meander Valley, West Tamar and Latrobe, in the Launceston and North-west and west regions of Tasmania. The 2016 census determined a population of 129 for the state suburb of Parkham.

History
The name ”Parkham” was applied to a Post station in the vicinity in 1886. It may be that this was named for Parkham in England.

Road infrastructure
The C711 route (Parkham Road) runs north-east from the Bass Highway to the locality.

References

Localities of Meander Valley Council
Localities of West Tamar Council
Localities of Latrobe Council
Towns in Tasmania